The Philippine Trade Training Center (PTTC) is an agency of the Department of Trade and Industry of the Republic of the Philippines.  The agency was founded in 1987 through Executive Order No. 133.  It is supported by the Japan International Cooperation Agency (JICA) through a development assistance grant from the Government of Japan.  It assists exporters, potential exporters, manufacturers, and entrepreneurs through provision of training on how to become competitive in the business field.  Training programs include advisory services on entrepreneurship development, export management, quality and productivity improvement, e-business, and e-commerce.  The center also has exhibition facilities for trade fairs and other events.

External links

Trade Training Center
Japan International Cooperation Agency
Department of Trade and Industry (Philippines)
Foreign trade of the Philippines